The Galgo Español ('Spanish galgo') or Spanish Greyhound is an ancient breed of dog, specifically a member of the sighthound family.
The English greyhound is possibly a descendant of the Spanish greyhound and, for several years in the 20th century, some breeders did cross-breed Galgos and Greyhounds in order to produce faster and more powerful Galgos, specifically for track racing purposes.

Description

Appearance

Galgos are similar in appearance to Greyhounds, but are distinctly different in their conformation. Galgos are higher in the rear than in the front, and have flatter muscling than a Greyhound, which is characteristic of endurance runners. They also tend to be smaller, lighter in build, have longer tails and have a very long, streamlined head that gives the impression of larger ears. Their chests are not as deep as a Greyhound's and should not reach the point of the elbow.

Unlike Greyhounds, Galgos come in two coat types: smooth and rough. The rough coat can provide extra protection from skin injuries while running in the field. They come in a variety of colors and coat patterns.

Temperament
Galgos have a very similar nature to Greyhounds. They are calm, quiet, gentle and laid back; happy to sleep their day away on their backs on a sofa. More than 90% of Galgos can be considered cat-friendly and are therefore an ideal choice for the hound lover who also owns cats. Almost all Galgos are also friendly towards other dogs and small dogs. Galgos are also very good with children, being calm in the house so there is less risk of a child being knocked over or jumped on than with a more excitable breed. They are very gentle and tolerate the often over-enthusiastic attentions of children with little risk of retaliation from the dog.
Galgos have a very reserved personality and they have a tendency towards shyness, so it is very important that they be socialized early in life so that they grow up to be comfortable around strange people, dogs and locations.

Health

Like many other sighthounds, Galgos are a fairly healthy breed although they are sensitive to anaesthesia. As such, proper care should be taken by the owner to ensure that the attending veterinarian is aware of this issue.
Although Galgos are big dogs, their history of selection as a working sighthound, their light weight, and their anatomy keep them safe from hip dysplasia. Unlike greyhounds, these dogs are not susceptible to corns or other common greyhound ailments. 
These dogs must run regularly and/or walked long distances to keep in perfect health, combined with their characteristic tendency to sleep the rest of the day.

History

The Spanish greyhound is thought by some popular writers to have descended from Egyptian dogs brought to the Iberian Peninsula by the Phoenicians nearly 3,000 years ago. However the existence of the Celtic vertragus in Roman Iberia 2,000 years ago, as described by Arrian and Martial, suggests that it and its possible descendant the Galgo, may more likely be of Western European type in origin. After it was established in Spain, it is thought to have been cross-bred centuries later with the Sloughi brought from North Africa by the Moors. Some writers suggest that this breed may be ancestral to the English Greyhound.

The Galgo name is probably derived from the Latin  or 'Dog from Gaul'. The same derivative is seen in the Italian  and the French .

Arrian described his personal experience in Spain. His description of hare hunting is very similar to that used with the Galgo nowadays in Spain, adding that it was a general Celtic tradition not related to social class. He indicated that there were not only smooth-haired types of the  but also rough-coated ones.

There is little evidence for mention of the Galgo or its antecedent in the first centuries of the Middle Ages, but it appeared to have survived and flourished in the second half of the period.

In the 9th and 10th centuries, coinciding with the Reconquista, great spaces in Castile were colonized resulting in Christian military repossession of the Iberian Peninsula from Muslim control. This open land introduced a new mode of hunting with dogs: while the North of Spain is mountainous, the regions progressively recovered were flat, open areas full of small animals like hares, which provided the Galgo a useful opportunity for hunting. At that time it was considered a noble dog, and was kept mainly by the aristocracy of both the Christian and the Muslim kingdoms in which Spanish territory was still divided. It is likely that the Galgo and the Sloughi (perhaps also Saluki) were interbred during this period.

The great esteem in which the Galgo was held is evident by the many laws of the time designed to punish the killing or theft of the breed: Fuero of Salamanca (9th century); Fuero of Cuenca; Fuero of Zorita de los Canes; Fuero of Molina de Aragón (12th century); Fuero of Usagre (12th century). In the Cartuario of Slonza is a will written in Villacantol in which, using an odd mixture of Latin and Spanish, the Mayor Gutiérrez bequeaths a Galgo to Diego Citid in the year 1081:

That this dog was a significant item in a noble's will demonstrates the great value accorded it at the time.

The mural paintings at the Hermitage of San Baudelio de Berlanga, in Soria, dating from the 12th century show a hunting scene with three Galgos apparently identical to the ones that we can see today.
 
In the Renaissance Martínez del Espinar writes in his book  ("The Art of Hunting and Archery"):

The Galgo appears to have developed first in the Castillian plains, both in the north (Valladolid, Zamora, Ávila Salamanca, Segovia, Soria, Burgos and Palencia) and the south (Toledo, Cuenca, Guadalajara, Madrid and Ciudad Real) of Castilla. And, afterwards, in more southern territories: La Mancha and Andalusia.
It became the typical dog type of the Spanish interior, while the bloodhound plays the same role in the coast regions.

The Galgo appears not only in hunting books but also in common Spanish expressions, as well as in literature. The most famous reference is perhaps the one contained in the opening sentence of :

There are plenty of common expressions in Spain that name the Galgo: for example,
, which means 'use old Galgos for chasing hares instead of rabbits', suggesting that it is best to use experienced people for hard tasks and challenges.
, meaning 'if a Galgo tries to chase two hares, it will return with none', recommending focussing on a single effort, otherwise failing by distraction.

Although the breed did not apparently experience any significant change in the 18th and 19th centuries, and was kept in its vocation as a swift hunting dog, maybe the most telling proverb which mentions the Galgo is one dating from the beginning of the nineteenth century: ; 'The hare never escapes from the King's Galgos', which was used at first to satirize the corrupt government of Fernando VII, considered to cheat in everything it did.

In the first years of the 20th century, large scale crossbreeding occurred between the Galgo and the English Greyhound in order to create faster dogs for professional track racing. This certainly affected the purity of the breed as the resulting dogs were just a bit faster, but did lose their long-distance-running abilities. Finally breeders came to the conclusion that it was not worth crossbreeding.
The purebred Galgo kept its major presence in the Spanish villages as an excellent hunting type.

Despite its antiquity and importance, the Spanish Galgo has only recently been acknowledged by cynological associations. The English Greyhound has tended to outshine the Galgo. The catastrophic events suffered by Spain during the 20th century, such as the Spanish Civil War and the 40-year-long fascist dictatorship of Francisco Franco, allowed the breed to be kept relatively unknown both inside and outside of its native country, at least until democracy led to greater social and cultural equality and development.

The breed faces the 21st century progressively more appreciated at home and abroad, as contemporary Spain becomes more conscious of the uniqueness and heritage of this animal.

Roles

Hunting use
The Galgo was used for hunting, as well as for coursing the hare in the open field where dogs hunt prey without the intervention of man during the chase. This type of hunting, which now has a true sporting character, was in the past an act of social prestige in which hunting was a pretext to prove who had the best specimens of the breed.

Because of its specific conditions, Spain is probably the country where sighthounds are used in greater numbers for hunting and sports than any other,, and Galgos are commonly found in any of the towns and cities of the vast area of the Spanish plains.
Galgo coursing competitions in Spain generate annually in the order of sixty million euros , a calculation which refers only to those aficionados which are members of the  societies. This lesser group of galgueros train annually between three thousand and four thousand Galgos for participation in the various Open Field Coursing Championships. This type of testing event, where each year the most characteristic athletic winner is rewarded, seems to show that the galgueros are retrieving the more authentic type of breed that was lost years ago.

Crossbreeding of the Galgo with Greyhounds for a faster racing type has stopped and has now been eradicated for several reasons: On the one hand, this hunting activity, coursing, is evolving by leaps and bounds and becoming a true sport where the killing of the hare is secondary to the beauty of the course. The hybrid Galgo loses much of that beauty, and what is increasingly valued is the purity of the Galgo Español.
On the other hand, the fact that the hare is protected more than ever against gun hunters, and it is increasingly hardier due to the selection of it having lost much of its natural cover due to the increase of plowed land and proliferation of roads, it promotes coursing with Galgos that have greater endurance.

The particular characteristics of landscape topography have a major effect, resulting in those Galgos that win for generations of coursing in Andalusia, not having the same characteristics as Galgos that win for generations of coursing in Castile.

In Andalusia and many parts of La Mancha vineyards and olive groves dominate the landscape offering the hare plenty of cover. The mild climate there provides the hare throughout the year abundant fodder without it having to travel long distances. Additionally it is less stressful for this prey to exist inside large farms without intersecting roads. All these issues will promote a winning type of Galgo in this landscape which is smaller, with shorter and more rounded muscling, i.e., higher power in the hindquarters. This is because it must be an agile  Galgo which enters and exits the turn faster and more easily. Lighter in weight because of the softness of the ground where reach must be more rapid if less strong, although one property does not necessarily exclude the other.

In Castile, with its large open spaces, the hare must travel greater distances in search of food and its only defense being away from cover are its legs, lungs and heart. This type of land and hare promotes another type of Galgo with a hard foot, deeper chest, longer and flatter muscling, ultimately a Galgo with greater endurance. These Galgos are heavier and are more attractive, and in fact have been considered purer of race, necessary for the preservation of the breed.

Further, outside Spain, in Chile (mainly in the Central Zone), this breed is used in competitions that take place on national holidays.

Galgos as pets 

Because they tend to be quiet and docile, Galgos make very nice house pets. In Spain they have a well earned reputation as gentle dogs, with sweet temperaments and solid health. They tend to get along well with people and other dogs, and they can be well-behaved around cats if properly socialized. Outside of sunny Spain, they require a warm coat to keep them warm in cold winter weather: like all greyhound-type breeds, they have little body fat and short coats, so extra warmth is preferred for colder climates.

Galgos excel at performance activities like lure coursing and racing. They are eligible to compete in lure coursing events sanctioned by the American Sighthound Field Association, entered in the Limited class. They also make very nice show dogs and have enjoyed success in the European show ring, although they are not as well known in the American show world due to their rarity outside Europe.

Animal cruelty concerns 
There are many reports of Galgos being treated cruelly by their hunters and breeders in Spain. Methods of killing reportedly include burning, hanging, stoning, and poisoning, which according to Finnish politician Laura Huhtasaari is "based on the belief that the more painfully a dog dies, the better luck a hunter will have next year." Some Galgos are strapped to moving cars as part of their training, which can lead to them being dragged by the car and mangled. Poorly performing dogs are often beaten, mutilated, starved to death, thrown down wells or hung from trees by their owners. Abusing dogs that hunt poorly was a widespread practice, as there were no penalties for hunters. A new law, as of January 5, 2022, amends the Civil Code to provide that animals may no longer be considered 'things' but 'sentient beings' and family members, and that animal owners are now required to provide proper care to ensure their animals’ well-being in accordance with the characteristics of each species.
For the reasons described above, associations in defense of the Galgo have appeared with the aim to save these dogs from a terrible fate, provide much needed rehabilitation and find them adoptive homes, usually in the cities. Some associations will adopt them to other locations in Europe, including France, the U.K., Germany, Belgium and the Netherlands.

See also
 Dogs portal
 List of dog breeds

References

External links
Dutch Galgo group on Facebook
Galgo Rescue International Network
Love, Hope, Believe, Galgo Adoption Inc.
Galgos del Sol
Video: How Galgos hunt

Dog breeds originating in Andalusia
Dog breeds originating in Castile and León
FCI breeds
Rare dog breeds
Sighthounds